Assunta Spina is a 1915 Italian silent film. Outside Italy, it is sometimes known as Sangue Napolitano ("Neapolitan Blood").

Plot
Assunta Spina is a laundress living in Naples, engaged to a violent butcher named Michele Mangiafuoco. She is also courted intensely by Raffaele. When she accepts Raffaele's offer to dance during an open air feast in Posillipo, as she feels Michele is ignoring her, tragedy strikes. Michele, blinded by rage, slashes her face and is subsequently arrested. During the trial she bears witness in order to rescue him, saying he never wounded her, but the jury does not believe her. She is enticed by the court vice-chancellor to strike a bargain—Michele will stay in the nearby prison of Naples instead of Avellino, and at the end of the punishment Michele will kill the vice-chancellor before Assunta's eyes.  She must take responsibility for the act before the eyes of the police in order to save her man.

Production
The original novel from which the story was taken was written by Salvatore di Giacomo, and had been adapted to a successful theatre drama in 1909. Before Francesca Bertini became a famous actress, she would perform in this drama as a walk-on in the laundry scenes. Five years later, when she had started her career as a film actress, she and actor-director Gustavo Serena adapted the drama for film.  Bertini is sometimes listed as co-director of the film. Bertini claimed with some support that she was the director of the film.  The film stock was colorized with 4 colors and distributed worldwide by Caesar Film.

Cast
Francesca Bertini - Assunta Spina
Gustavo Serena - Michele Boccadifuoco 
Carlo Benetti - Don Federigo Funelli 
Luciano Albertini - Raffaele 
Amelia Cipriani - Peppina 
Antonio Cruichi - Assunta's father 
Alberto Collo - Officer 
Alberto Albertini

Legacy

Francesca Bertini fully displayed her talent for the first time, introducing a new style of acting on the Italian silver screen. Her performance is generally rated as extraordinary, and in polar opposition to the work of writer and dramatist Gabriele D'Annunzio, who was very popular at the time.

For example, the movie Cabiria by Giovanni Pastrone (1914)—one of the first known films where a camera moves through scenes while filming—was once considered a masterpiece at least in part because D'Annunzio had written the captions, but to modern moviegoers they seem excessively emphatic and redundant. The same can be said of the marked gestures of many actors and actresses of the silent era.  Bertini wanted to end this affected behavior, so she focused on realism.  Her performances bear a closer resemblance to reality because of some acting devices: never look into the camera, use everyday gestures, and so on. This acting style also reduced the need for captions explaining the action.

Other versions
In 1930 the plot of Assunta Spina inspired a new film by Roberto Roberti. Another was produced in 1948, directed by Mario Mattoli, with Anna Magnani and Eduardo De Filippo as the protagonists.

References

External links

1915 films
1910s Italian-language films
Italian silent feature films
Films based on Italian novels
Italian films based on plays
Realism (art movement)
Italian black-and-white films
Films set in Naples
Films based on multiple works